Barbara Leigh (born Barbara Ann Kish, November 16, 1946) is a former American actress and fashion model. Her breakthrough role came in 1972 with the film Junior Bonner, which she starred alongside her then-boyfriend Steve McQueen. She later  became the first model to wear the Vampirella costume on the cover of the original Warren Vampirella magazine, #67 (March 1975).

Early life
Barbara Leigh was born in Ringgold, Georgia. Leigh married at age 15, and at the age of 17 she gave birth to her only son, Gerry Haynes.

Career
In 2002, she published a memoir titled The King, McQueen, and The Love Machine, which accounts her romances with McQueen, Elvis Presley, and Jim Aubrey in the early 1970s.

In January 2014, Barbara Leigh retired from Playboy Enterprises Inc. after working with the company for almost 17 years.

Leigh developed hyperthyroidism (Graves' disease) and has been spokeswoman for the National Graves' Disease Foundation.

Filmography

References

External links

Personal Website
 Time Machine

American film actresses
Female models from Georgia (U.S. state)
Living people
1946 births
Actresses from Georgia (U.S. state)
People from Ringgold, Georgia
American television actresses
21st-century American women